Details of a Sunset and Other Stories is a collection of thirteen short stories by Vladimir Nabokov. All were written in Russian by Nabokov between 1924 and 1935 as an expatriate in Berlin, Paris, and Riga and published individually in the émigré press at that time later to be translated into English by him and his son, Dmitri Nabokov. The collection was published with a foreword by the author in 1976.

Stories included 
 "Details of a Sunset"
 "A Bad Day"
 "Orache"
 "The Return of Chorb"
 "The Passenger" 
 "A Letter that Never Reached Russia"
 "A Guide to Berlin"
 "The Doorbell"
 "The Thunderstorm"
 "The Reunion"
 "A Slice of Life"
 "Christmas"
 "A Busy Man"

Short story collections by Vladimir Nabokov
1976 short story collections